Thomas Bell (22 November 1863 – 8 December 1945) was a Conservative member of the House of Commons of Canada. He was born in Saint John, New Brunswick, becoming a lumber merchant and merchant.

Bell attended school at Saint John, and later became a member of the Military Hospital Commission in World War I.

He was first elected to Parliament at the St. John—Albert riding in the 1925 general election with fellow Conservative candidate Murray MacLaren. He was re-elected there in 1926 and 1930. After completing the 17th Canadian Parliament, Bell left federal politics and did not seek another term in the 1935 election.

References

External links
 

1863 births
1945 deaths
Politicians from Saint John, New Brunswick
Canadian merchants
Conservative Party of Canada (1867–1942) MPs
Members of the House of Commons of Canada from New Brunswick